The following is a list of manhwa (Korean comics) that have been licensed for translation into English.

List

References 

South Korean entertainment-related lists
Lists of comics by country